Guadalupe is a corregimiento of La Chorrera District in Panama. Guadalupe had a population of 34,242 people in 2010 and its representative is Sumaya Judith Cedeño (2009–2012). It is part of the urban area of La Chorrera.

References

External links 
 La Chorrera website.

Populated places in Panamá Oeste Province